Marcelle Neveu (2 November 1906 – 3 June 1993) was a French middle-distance runner. She competed in the women's 800 metres at the 1928 Summer Olympics.

References

External links
 

1906 births
1993 deaths
Athletes (track and field) at the 1928 Summer Olympics
French female middle-distance runners
Olympic athletes of France
Women's World Games medalists
20th-century French women